Dennis Hall (13 December 1923 – 15 February 2005) was  a former Australian rules footballer who played with Fitzroy in the Victorian Football League (VFL).

Notes

External links 
		

1923 births
2005 deaths
Australian rules footballers from Victoria (Australia)
Fitzroy Football Club players
Brunswick Football Club players